Tengku Zatashah binti Sultan Sharafuddin Idris Shah (born 12 October 1973) is a member of the Selangor royal family who is the second daughter of Sultan Sharafuddin Idris Shah, the current and ninth Sultan of Selangor.

Early life
Zatashah was born on 12 October 1973 to the then Raja Muda of Selangor (the crown prince), Tengku Idris Shah and his first wife, Raja Zarina binti Raja Tan Sri Zainal. Her parents were divorced in 1987, when she was fourteen. She has an elder sister, Tengku Zerafina and a younger half-brother, Tengku Amir Shah.

She attended Alice Smith School, Kuala Lumpur from 1978 to 1983. She received her secondary education at a public school in London. She received her Bachelor of Arts (Hons) in Spanish and French from Middlesex University, London on 1996. She also went to Université de la Sorbonne, receiving her diploma, Diplôme Cours de Civilisations française in 2001. She furthered her study to the American Graduate School of International Relations and Diplomacy (ASGIRD), Paris and received her Masters in International Relations & Diplomacy in 2007. At some point, she also studied and graduated from INSEAD in Finance for Executives programme, in Fontainebleau, France.

She is fluent in Malay, English, French and Spanish. Zatashah is also a holder of Teaching of English in Foreign Language (TEFL) Cambridge diploma, of which she received from British Council, Kuala Lumpur.

Career

She started her career as an account executive of BDDP, an advertising agency in Barcelona, Spain from 1995 to 1996. She also worked as Front Desk Manager of Ascott Hotel, London from 1996 to 1997. Her first journalist career started when she became a featured writer and journalist in New Straits Times from 2001 to 2003, writing in Life and Times section. She is also the Editor-in-chief of Malaysian Association France from 2005 to 2007.

From 2005 until 2009, she worked as International Corporate Communications Manager at L'Oréal Paris, in France. There, she spearheaded communication policies in sustainable development, Human Resources, media training of Management Committee, and was a key member if crisis management. She became a columnist on The Edge (Malaysia) from 2009 to 2010.

She shifted her career focus in 2009 when she became the joint managing director, with her husband, to Originalo Sdn Bhd from 2009 until 2014. She is also the chairman and CEO of Light Cibles Malaysia, an international lighting design consultancy firm since 2011. Some of her projects include Kuala Lumpur Lighting Master Plan and development of Four Seasons Place Kuala Lumpur, PJ Sentral Garden City and Iskandar Malaysia. Zatashah is also an independent non-executive director of Kim teck Cheong Holdings Berhad, a Sabah-based Consumer Packaged Goods (CPG) distribution company since December 2014.

Personal life
Zatashah met her husband, Aubry Rahim Mennesson (né Aubry Marie Mennesson), SSIS, (born ), a French born film producer and entrepreneur, in 2005 through mutual friends, while working for L'Oreal and completing her masters in Paris. Mennesson, a native of Paris was asked to show the city around to Zatashah, who was new in the region. Mennesson did not know of her royal status in the first few months they started seeing each other, as Zatashah had introduced herself as only a "diplomat girl". He only realised that she was a princess after seeing a card from her father with a picture of him in full regalia. 

Mennesson converted to Islam prior to their wedding and learnt under Algerian-born Dr Dalil Boubakeur, the Grand Imam and rector of the Grande Mosquée de Paris, who is also the head of the French-Muslim association. The couple married at the Grande Mosquée de Paris, France on 10 November 2007. The solemnization ceremony was also officiated by Dr Dalil Boubakeur. 

A wedding reception was held on 28 February 2008 at Istana Alam Shah, Klang. Sharafuddin of Selangor hosted the dinner at the Royal Banquet Hall, which was served by personnel from Royal Malaysian Navy. Tengku Amir Shah gave a speech at the event, saying that his sister is a "funny and hardworking girl". Among the guests who attended the reception were the then-Regent of Perak, Raja Dr Nazrin Shah and his wife Raja Puan Besar Perak Tuanku Zara Salim, the then-Selangor Mentri Besar, Khir Toyo and wife, and the wife to the then-Deputy Prime Minister of Malaysia, Rosmah Mansor. Guests were entertained by musicians from Gamelan Diraja Selangor and Shah Alam City Council orchestra.

Philanthropy
Upon her return to Malaysia in 2010, Zatashah joined Alliance Française Kuala Lumpur as vice-president, and was later elected as president. As president, she helmed the development of strategic expansion of satellite classes, and increased awareness of its cultural activity. She was nominated to represent Asia and Malaysia at the Foundation Alliance Francaise Convention 2013 in Paris. As president, she organised a French cultural festival, Le French Festival in April 2019, featuring the largest French Film Festival in Malaysia, live theatre and dance performances, among others.

Zatashah is the royal patron of Make-A-Wish-Malaysia since 2015.
She is also a volunteer at Kechara Soup Kitchen, a non-profit organisation that focused on feeding the homeless since 2015.

In 2016, through Make-A-Wish Malaysia, she launched the #ZeroFoodWestage campaign, encouraging major hotels in Klang Valley to direct their excess food to Kechara Soup Kitchen. The campaign was launched after she learnt that Ramadan buffet waste at least 270,000 tonnes of food.

She also kicked-off a social media campaign, #SayNo2Plastic in 2016, encouraging Malaysian to avoid using single-used plastic, and it became one of the biggest anti single-used plastic movement in the country. She posted pictures of her and the members of the royal family carrying their Tiffin carrier while going to bazaar Ramadan in her instagram account. She also showed how she gave up plastic straws and swapped them for metal straws. Zatashah carried her own collapsible coffee cup and tumbler around in effort to not use plastic water bottles. As a result of her eco-friendly ways, she is known as "the girl with the tiffin" among the vendor owners. She received an award for her campaign at International Dive and Maritime Expo Adex Singapore in April 2019. She is also named as Adex Ocean Ambassador.

On 8 October 2018, she collaborated with CH Carolina Herrera in a campaign, "Shop with a cause". She invited several guests to the shop, where ten percent proceeds from every purchase in-store will go to Make-A-Wish Malaysia.

Zatashah hosted a beach clean-up in Pulau Redang, where volunteers managed to collect 4,655 plastic water bottles in two hours in May 2019. In July 2019, she hosted a beach clean-up programme at Pantai Morib Baru. She and a group of 500 volunteers end up collecting about 780kg of trash, nearly half of them are from plastic waste.

Interest
Zatashah is an advocate for healthy lifestyle. She exercised regularly, doing kickboxing, BodyAttack, cardio workout, and high-intensity interval training (HIIT). She also attended dance classes, her favourite being SH'Bam, a cardio dance workout. In an interview, she stated, "as you get older you realise that being healthy is so important because when you are fit, you get to do more things."

Zatashah is a fan of classical music. She launched the Selangor Symphony Orchestra with Eugene Pook, a maestro, in 2015 and became its royal patron.

She became a Foundation board member of her alma mater, Alice Smith School in January 2019.

Fashion

Zatashah's appearance is synonymous with baju kebaya, as she always wore the traditional outfit no matter where she went, either while attending an official event or in her daily life. Sometimes, she matched the kebaya top with a pair of slacks, to give it a modern flair. Nona, a Malaysian women lifestyle magazine described her as "a woman with a classical soul".

She launched a collection of hairband, in collaboration with Sereni & Shentel named, SSxTZ. The collection featured seven distinct limited edition Blair headband with coloured inspired by Zatashah's personal batik collection. All the proceeds of the collection will go towards Make-A-Wish Malaysia.

Honours and awards

Honours of Selangor
  Knight Grand Companion of the Order of Sultan Sharafuddin Idris Shah (SSIS, 11 December 2009)
  Sultan Sharafuddin Coronation Medal First Class in gold (8 March 2003)
  Sultan Salahuddin Silver Jubilee Medal (3 September 1985)

Honours of Malaysia

  Recipient of the Sultan Salahuddin Abdul Aziz Shah Yang di-Pertuan Agong Installation Medal (26 April 1999)

Foreign honours
 
 Chevalier (Knight) of the National Order of the Legion of Honour of France (19 April 2017)

Notes

References

1973 births
Living people
Malaysian people of Bugis descent
Royal House of Selangor
Malaysian people of Malay descent
Citizens of Malaysia through descent
Malaysian Muslims
Daughters of monarchs